The 1899 Arizona football team was an American football team that represented the University of Arizona as an independent during the 1899 college football season. In its first season of football, the team compiled a 1–1–1 record and outscored all opponents, 24 to 16. The team was organized in January 1899 by Professor R. H. Forbes, but no games were played until the fall when a student committee raised $70 from merchants in the Old Pueblo to purchase uniforms. Stuart Forbes was the team's coach, George M. Parker was the manager and team captain. The team's colors during the 1899 season were sage green and silver.

Schedule

Game summaries
On November 20, 1899, the University of Arizona football team played its first official football game, after an earlier practice game against a Tucson, Arizona, town team. The November 20 game, also played against a Tucson town team, ended in a scoreless tie.

On November 30, 1899, the team played its first intercollegiate football game against the Normal School of Arizona (later renamed Arizona State University).  The inaugural meeting in the Arizona–Arizona State football rivalry ended in an 11–2 score in favor of the Tempe team. The game was played in front of an estimated 300 spectators at the Carillo Gardens amusement center near the Santa Cruz River in Tucson.

The team's third game was played on January 13, 1900, against the football team from the Tucson Indian School.  The University team won that game by a 22 to 0 score.

Players
The team's roster included the following players: Willard Morse Brown, Duncan Hugh Campbell, Rudolph Castaneda, Courtland F. Day, Frank Wakefield Fish, John Garnett Holmes, Thomas K. Marshall, William Thomas Olney, Charles P. Richmond, James Newton Robinson, Guy Lionel Rockwell, Ross M. Russell, Edward S. Stafford, and Benito G. Suarez. Another account lists players with the surnames French and Parker.

References

Arizona
Arizona Wildcats football seasons
Arizona football